Kuyavians is an ethnographic group of Polish people, that originate from the region of Kuyavia, located within the Kuyavian-Pomeranian Voivodeship and eastern Greater Poland Voivodeship in Poland. They speak the Kuyavian dialect of the Greater Poland dialect cluster of Polish language. The group itself been influenced by nearby groups of Kashubians and Greater Poland people.

Notes

References 

Lechites
Polish people
Slavic ethnic groups
Ethnic groups in Poland
Greater Poland
Kuyavian-Pomeranian Voivodeship
Greater Poland Voivodeship